Sings Hank Williams is a compilation album by American singer-songwriter Johnny Cash. It was released on September 5, 1960, by Sun Records after Cash had left the label and signed with Columbia Records. Despite the title, the album does not exclusively cover Hank Williams material, but is also made up of songs that Cash recorded for Sun prior to leaving the label. The album was re-issued in 2003 by Varèse Sarabande with five bonus tracks, two of them being alternate recordings of songs already available on the album.

Only the first four of the twelve tracks on the album were written by Williams, with most of the others being written by Cash. (Additional songs composed by Williams are included in the 2003 reissue.) About half of the songs on the album had previously been issued on LP by Sun. Making their album debut are the tracks "Straight A's in Love", "Come In Stranger", "Give My Love to Rose", "Mean-Eyed Cat" and "I Love You Because".

Track listing

Charts
Singles - Billboard (North America)

References

External links
LP Discography entry on Sings Hank Williams

Johnny Cash albums
1960 albums
Hank Williams tribute albums
Sun Records albums
Albums produced by Sam Phillips
Albums produced by Jack Clement
Varèse Sarabande albums